The Hanjin Sooho class is a series of 9 container ships built for the now defunct Hanjin Shipping. The ships were built by Hyundai Heavy Industries in South Korea. The ships have a maximum theoretical capacity of around 13,102 twenty-foot equivalent units (TEU).

Following the bankruptcy of Hanjin Shipping, the ships were auctioned off and are now operated by Maersk Line and Mediterranean Shipping Company.

List of ships

References 

Container ship classes
Ships built by Hyundai Heavy Industries Group